The Indiana Fever are an American professional basketball team based in Indianapolis, playing in the Eastern Conference in the Women's National Basketball Association (WNBA). The team was founded before the 2000 season began. The team is owned by Herb Simon, who also owns the Fever's NBA counterpart, the Indiana Pacers, and Simon Malls.

The Fever has qualified for the WNBA Playoffs in 13 of its 21 seasons in Indiana. Some of the players who have helped define the history of the Fever include the American players Tamika Catchings, Katie Douglas, and Tully Bevilaqua from Australia. In 2009, the Fever went to the WNBA Finals but fell short to Phoenix. On October 21, 2012, the Fever won the WNBA Championship with a win over the Minnesota Lynx. Tamika Catchings was named the series MVP.

Franchise history

2000–2004
The Indiana Fever team began in 2000, when the state was granted an expansion franchise to coincide with the opening of Gainbridge Fieldhouse (then Conseco Fieldhouse). In their first two seasons, they were coached by women's basketball legends Anne Donovan and Nell Fortner. Led by center Kara Wolters, in their inaugural campaign the team posted a record of 9–23.

The Fever drafted University of Tennessee star Tamika Catchings in the 2001 WNBA Draft. The Fever went into the year with high expectations of a playoff berth, but Catchings tore her ACL during a college game and missed the entire WNBA season. The Fever posted a 10–22 record in 2001.

After missing the entire 2001 season, the 2002 season proved to be the breakout season for Tamika Catchings and the Fever. Catchings came out strong and became one of the most versatile players in the WNBA, easily winning Rookie of the Year honors as well as making the WNBA All-Star team. Her team competed well all year and posted a respectable 16–16 record, tying for the final playoff spot with the Orlando Miracle. Indiana won the tiebreaker and earned their first playoff appearance in franchise history. They drew the #1 seed in the playoffs, the Liberty; with the Fever losing two games to one.

The 2002–2003 offseason brought a lot of change for the Fever. The team added Olympian Natalie Williams and Charlotte Sting star Kelly Miller before the 2003 season. During the offseason the original coach and GM Nell Fortner resigned. Kelly Krauskopf replaced Fortner as GM and immediately hired Brian Winters to be the head coach. On May 29, 2003, the Fever registered their first sellout of 18,345 and defeated the Washington Mystics on national television. The team did better under the new coaching, but missed the playoffs, posting a 16–18 record.

The 2004 campaign was very similar to 2003's. The Fever finished with a 15–19 record. They missed the playoffs by one game in the Eastern Conference.

2005–2007
In 2005, the Fever had their best season since joining the league, posting a 21–13 record, and making the playoffs for just the second time. In the first round, the Fever swept the New York Liberty two games to none, earning their first playoff series victory in franchise history. In the Eastern Conference Finals, the Fever faced the heavily favored Connecticut Sun. Game 1 came down to the final seconds when Katie Douglas hit a crucial three to win the game for the Sun. Game 2 went into overtime, with the Sun winning, thus sweeping the Fever two games to none.

In the 2005–2006 offseason, the Fever acquired All-Star Anna DeForge from the Phoenix Mercury in exchange for Kelly Miller. Later that offseason the Fever made another All-Star addition by signing free agent Tamika Whitmore from the Los Angeles Sparks. In the 2006 WNBA Draft they selected athletic swing-forward La'Tangela Atkinson from the North Carolina Tar Heels along with Kasha Terry from the Georgia Tech Yellow Jackets.

The Fever started the 2006 season off at 4–0 and jumped out to an early lead in the Eastern Conference standings. Teammates Tamika Catchings and Tully Bevilaqua led the league in steals, first and second respectively, the first time teammates led the league in one statistical category. The Fever posted a 21–13 record, making the playoffs for the second year in a row. In the first round, the Fever faced archrival Detroit. Detroit won Game 1 in Indianapolis and held a one-game to nothing lead in the series. Game 2 in Detroit was a high-scoring affair with Tamika Whitmore scoring a WNBA Playoff record 41 points. Detroit won in the end, 98–83 and won the series two games to none.

Going into the 2006–2007 off-season, the Fever looked to improve their post play. In the Dispersal Draft, the Fever added veteran forward Sheri Sam from the Charlotte Sting. Kelly Krauskopf and the front office then set their eyes on key Free Agent Center Tammy Sutton-Brown, signing her on March 22, 2007. The Fever also selected 6–7 center Alison Bales from Duke University in the 2007 WNBA Draft to go along with Sutton-Brown.

Going into the 2007 season, the Fever had their eyes set on the WNBA Finals. They started off the season strong, winning 16 out of their first 20 games, which was the best 20 game start in history of the Eastern Conference. Then on July 20, key player Tamika Catchings injured her foot causing her to miss the rest of the regular season. The injury was later revealed as a partial tear of her plantar fascia. The Fever finished 5–9 without Catchings. They won the #2 seed in the Eastern Conference Playoffs, beating out the Connecticut Sun. They played the same Sun team in first round of the playoffs. Game 1 in Connecticut was an epic battle, going three overtimes with the Sun hanging on to win Game 1, 93–88. The Fever won Game 2 at home by double digits forcing a decisive Game 3. In game 3, the Fever found themselves down by 22 points late halfway through the 3rd quarter. The Fever battled back to win Game 3 in overtime by the same score as Game 1 93–88. The 22-point comeback was the largest comeback in WNBA Playoff history. In the Eastern Conference Finals, the Fever played their other hated rival, the Detroit Shock. The Fever grabbed an early lead in the series, winning Game 1 at Conseco Fieldhouse. With the team just 1 game away from the WNBA Finals the Fever traveled to Detroit. In Game 2, the game was close until the 2nd quarter, when the Shock blew the game wide open with a 14–0 run, easily winning the game. With a spot in the Finals up for grabs in Game 3, the Fever started off the game with an early 17–3 lead. Then late in the first half Catchings went down with another injury; she had completely torn her Achilles tendon. The Shock ended up winning Game 3, 85–61.

2008
On October 26, 2007, the Fever announced that they declined the option for head coach Brian Winters, ending his four-year tenure in charge. He compiled a 78–58 regular season record with a 5–7 playoff record. On December 12, 2007, assistant coach Lin Dunn was named his successor to the job as head coach.

In one of the biggest trades in WNBA history, the Fever traded Tamika Whitmore and their first-round pick in the 2008 WNBA Draft for Indianapolis native, Katie Douglas on February 19, 2008.

The Fever were part of the Liberty Outdoor Classic, which was the first regular-season professional basketball game played outdoors. It was played between the Fever and New York Liberty at Arthur Ashe Stadium in Flushing, New York on July 19, 2008, with the Fever winning the game, 71–55.

During the 2008 season, the Fever struggled in comparison to the three previous seasons. They finished with a 17–17 record, good for fourth place in the playoffs. Meeting the Detroit Shock in the first round, the Fever lost in three games.

2009–2012
After a disappointing 2008 season, the Fever were looking to improve in 2009. Indiana Pacers owners had said the Fever have been losing money.  The only thing to save the Fever from folding in the near future, the owners inferred, was for the Fever to be successful on the court and at the box office. The Fever took the owners' ultimatum to heart and reached the playoffs as the first seed overall in the Eastern Conference with a franchise best record of 22–12. In the first round, the Fever ousted the Washington Mystics in a sweep, marking their return to the conference finals. In the East finals, again facing their rival Detroit Shock, they reached their first ever WNBA Finals by defeating the Shock in three games. The Fever then lost in 5 games to the Phoenix Mercury in the WNBA Finals.

Because of the success in 2009, the Fever announced they would remain in Indianapolis for 2010. Their 2011 season in Indianapolis was also confirmed as well.

In 2012, the Fever advanced to the 2012 WNBA Finals. Indiana then defeated the Minnesota Lynx, 3 games to 1. It was the Fever's first WNBA title.

2012–2016
After the Fever won the 2012 WNBA championship, the ownership group took notice of their management – by promoting general manager Kelly Krauskopf to president of the franchise. Krauskopf has been giving additional duties within the franchise as well as a pay increase. The Fever competed for another title in 2015, reaching the finals for the third time in franchise history, but fell short losing to the Minnesota Lynx in five games. In 2016, the Fever made it to the playoffs for the 12th consecutive time (the current WNBA record for most consecutive playoff appearances by a team). However, the Fever were upset in the first round elimination game against the Phoenix Mercury after the league's new playoff format was in effect. This game also marked the final game of Tamika Catchings's playing career; she had been known as the Fever's franchise player since 2002.

2016–present
On November 18, 2016, it was announced that the Fever hired Pokey Chatman as their new head coach. In February 2017, the Fever traded for five-time all-star Candice Dupree along with the Mercury's 2017 first-round pick in a three-team deal that sent Camille Little and Jillian Alleyne to the Mercury and the Connecticut Sun receiving the 8th overall pick in the 2017 WNBA Draft along with Lynetta Kizer from the Fever. Despite acquiring a veteran all-star forward and a new head coach, the Fever would have one of the most disappointing seasons in franchise history. On August 12, 2017, the Fever were defeated 111–52 by the Minnesota Lynx, making it the largest margin of defeat in WNBA history, in which they allowed a league record 37–0 scoring run during the game. The Fever finished with the second-worst record in the league of 9–25 in their first season after Catchings's retirement, ending their streak of 12 consecutive playoff seasons.

In 2018, disappointment continued for the Fever as they rebuilt their team. They finished in last place, this time with a 6–28 record. On March 4, 2019, Pacers Sports & Entertainment announced Allison Barber, a graduate of Tennessee Temple University and Indiana University, as the new president and chief operating officer of the Fever, while Catchings was named vice president of Fever Basketball Operations. They wound up with the third selection in the 2019 WNBA draft, selecting Teaira McCowan from Mississippi State. The 2019 season saw some improvement, but the team nonetheless finished 13–21, two games behind the last playoff spot. After the season, coach and general manager Pokey Chatman was fired.

On November 27, 2019, Marianne Stanley was introduced as the head coach of the Indiana Fever, making her the seventh coach in the franchise's 20-year WNBA history. In addition, it was also announced that Catchings would be promoted to general manager.

Near the end of the 2019 season, the Fever announced that they would move their home games to Butler University's Hinkle Fieldhouse for the 2020 and 2021 seasons, plus at least part of the 2022 season, to accommodate renovations of Bankers Life Fieldhouse. The team planned to return to the renamed Gainbridge Fieldhouse upon project completion. However, the 2020 WNBA season was played in IMG Academy in Bradenton, Florida, due to the COVID-19 pandemic. For the 2021 season, the Fever played their first four home games at Bankers Life Fieldhouse, before playing the remaining home games at Indiana Farmers Coliseum.

On February 14, 2022, Tamika Catchings stepped down as the vice president of basketball operations and general manager of the Indiana Fever.

On February 24, 2022, former Fever coach Lin Dunn, who guided the team to a WNBA title in 2012, was introduced as the franchise’s interim general manager and senior advisor for Fever basketball operations.

Uniforms
2000–2006: The home jerseys were white with red, dark blue and yellow on the sides. On the front, Fever was written across. The road jersey were dark blue with red and yellow on the sides. Indiana in red letters trimmed with white on the chest.
2007–2010: Home jerseys are white with blue and yellow strips/trim from the neck down the side. Fever is written in red across the front and on the back the player name is written in all dark blue under the number also in red trimmed in dark blue. The new road jerseys are dark blue with yellow and white trim/strips. Indiana is written on the front in red with white trim and on the back the number is in red with white trim with the player's name underneath in all white. Each jersey has the Fever's alternate logo at the top on the back.
2011–2012: As part of the move to Adidas's Revolution 30 technology, the Fever made subtle changes to the uniforms. Home uniforms remain white, but the 'Fever' wordmark is now written in navy with red and yellow trim. Numbers are now rounded and in red. Away uniforms remain unchanged save for the striping patterns and rounded numbers.
2013–2015: On October 19, 2012, the Fever announced that Finish Line will be their uniform sponsor, beginning with the 2013 season. The uniform stayed the same aside from a new number scheme and the addition of the uniform sponsor.
2016: As part of a league-wide initiative for its 20th season, all games featured all-color uniform matchups. Therefore, the Fever unveiled a yellow jersey as a light-colored uniform to complement its standard navy uniform.
2019: The Fever announced Salesforce as their uniform sponsor, replacing Finish Line. Along with all other WNBA team uniforms, the front of the jersey prominently features both Salesforce and AT&T, a new partner for the WNBA. The number of the player is now just on the back of the jersey.

Season-by-season records

Players

Current roster

Former players

Tully Bevilaqua (2005–2010)
Tamika Catchings (2002–2016), served as the team's general manager (2020-2022)
Anna DeForge (2006–2007)
Katie Douglas (2008–2013)
Candice Dupree (2017–2020)
Yolanda Griffith (2009)
Ebony Hoffman (2004–2009)
Niele Ivey (2001–2004), currently the head coach of the Notre Dame Fighting Irish women's basketball team
Nikki McCray (2002–2003)
Kelly Miller (2004–2005)
Bridget Pettis (2002–2003)
Kristen Rasmussen (2003–2004)
Kelly Schumacher (2001–2005)
Olympia Scott (2001–2002, 2006)
Coquese Washington (2002–2003), currently an associate head coach for the Notre Dame Fighting Irish women's basketball team
Stephanie White (2000–2004), currently the head coach of the Connecticut Sun
Tan White (2005–2008)
Tamika Whitmore (2006–2007)
Natalie Williams (2003–2005)
Kara Wolters (2000)
Shavonte Zellous (2010–2015)
Shyra Ely (2011)

Retired numbers

Coaches and staff

Owners
Herb Simon (2000–present), owner of the Indiana Pacers
Melvin Simon (2000–2009), former co-owner of the Indiana Pacers

Head coaches

General managers
Nell Fortner (2000–2003)
Kelly Krauskopf (2004–2017)
Pokey Chatman (2018–2019)
Tamika Catchings (2020–2022)
Lin Dunn (2022–Present)

Assistant coaches
Shelley Patterson (2000–2003)
Julie Plank (2000–2007)
Lin Dunn (2004–2007)
Jim Lewis (2008–2010)
Gary Kloppenburg (2008–2011, 2015–2016, 2022)
Stephanie White (2011–2014)
Mickie DeMoss (2012–2013)
Sylvia Crawley (2014)
Gail Goestenkors (2015)
Steven Key (2016–2017)
Jessica Miller (2017–2019)
Christie Sides (2018–2019)
Steve Smith (2020–2021)
April (McDivitt) Schilling (2020)
Le'Coe Willingham (2020)
Jhared Simpson (2021–present)
Vicki Hall (2021–2022)
Carlos Knox (2022) 
Karima Christmas-Kelly (2023–present) 
Jessie Miller (2023–present)

Statistics

|-
| 2000
| K. Wolters (11.9)
| K. Wolters (5.3)
| R. Williams (3.2)
| 69.2 vs 71.6
| 29.1 vs 29.8
| .433 vs .449
|-
| 2001
| R. Williams (11.9)
| J. Streimikyte (5.1)
| R. Williams (3.6)
| 67.3 vs 70.3
| 29.2 vs 30.2
| .418 vs .449
|-
| 2002
| T. Catchings (18.6)
| T. Catchings (8.6)
| T. Catchings (3.7)
| 65.5 vs 66.5
| 29.6 vs 29.1
| .401 vs .442
|-
| 2003
| T. Catchings (19.7)
| T. Catchings (8.0)
| T. Catchings (3.4)
| 68.7 vs 68.3
| 29.1 vs 29.0
| .417 vs .439
|-
| 2004
| T. Catchings (16.7)
| T. Catchings (7.3)
| T. Catchings (3.4)
| 64.6 vs 66.0
| 32.4 vs 28.5
| .393 vs .431
|-
| 2005
| T. Catchings (14.7)
| T. Catchings (7.8)
| T. Catchings (4.2)
| 63.8 vs 62.7
| 29.8 vs 29.1
| .400 vs .431
|-
| 2006
| T. Catchings (16.3)
| T. Catchings (7.5)
| T. Catchings (3.7)
| 71.6 vs 68.1
| 32.2 vs 31.2
| .407 vs .432
|-
| 2007
| T. Catchings (16.6)
| T. Catchings (9.0)
| T. Catchings (4.7)
| 72.9 vs 69.7
| 33.9 vs 34.2
| .419 vs .402
|-
| 2008
| K. Douglas (15.6)
| E. Hoffman (7.8)
| T. Catchings (3.3)
| 72.7 vs 72.3
| 33.1 vs 34.4
| .402 vs .419
|-
| 2009
| K. Douglas (17.6)
| T. Catchings (7.2)
| T. Catchings (3.1)
| 76.6 vs 73.6
| 33.0 vs 34.3
| .402 vs .429
|-

|-
| 2010
| T. Catchings (18.2)
| T. Catchings (7.1)
| T. Catchings (4.0)
| 78.3 vs 74.1
| 32.5 vs 33.0
| .438 vs .416
|-
| 2011
| T. Catchings (15.5)
| T. Catchings (7.1)
| T. Catchings (3.5)
| 77.7 vs 73.8
| 31.6 vs 33.4
| .443 vs .424
|-
| 2012
| T. Catchings (17.4)
| T. Catchings (7.6)
| B. January (3.9)
| 78.3 vs 72.3
| 32.2 vs 34.4
| .418 vs .429
|-
| 2013
| T. Catchings (17.7)
| E. Larkins (7.8)
| B. January (3.7)
| 70.8 vs 70.5
| 32.0 vs 33.6
| .393 vs .437
|-
| 2014
| T. Catchings (16.1)
| E. Larkins (9.2)
| B. January (3.7)
| 74.1 vs 75.1
| 32.3 vs 31.9
| .418 vs .443
|-
| 2015
| T. Catchings (13.1)
| T. Catchings (7.1)
| B. January (3.4)
| 77.7 vs 75.8
| 32.4 vs 32.8
| .424 vs .440
|-
| 2016
| T. Catchings (12.9)
| E. Larkins (7.4)
| B. January (4.7)
| 80.5 vs 80.9
| 30.9 vs 31.5
| .447 vs .467
|-
| 2017
| C. Dupree (15.0)
| C. Dupree (5.8)
| E. Wheeler (4.1)
| 75.1 vs 84.3
| 28.2 vs 35.2
| .429 vs .473
|-
| 2018
| C. Dupree (14.2)
| N. Achonwa (6.9)
| E. Wheeler (4.1)
| 76.4 vs 85.7 
| 33.0 vs 37.0
| .406 vs .473
|-
| 2019
| K. Mitchell (13.6)
| T. McCowan (9.0)
| E. Wheeler (5.0)
| 77.6 vs 80.3 
| 35.1 vs 34.7
| .422 vs .422
|-

|-
| 2020
| K. Mitchell (17.9)
| T. McCowan (7.3)
| J. Allemand (5.8)
| 81.7 vs 89.5
| 33.7 vs 32.7
| .442 vs .472
|-
| 2021
| K. Mitchell (17.8)
| T. McCowan (9.8)
| D. Robinson (3.7)
| 75.3 vs 85.1
| 34.3 vs 33.4
| .416 vs .459
|-
| 2022
| K. Mitchell (18.4)
| N. Smith (7.9)
| K. Mitchell (4.2)
| 78.0 vs 89.1
| 33.3 vs 35.8
| .409 vs .474
|-

Media coverage
Currently, most Fever games are broadcast online through FeverBasketball.com and the Indiana Fever Facebook Page. Select games air instead on Bally Sports Indiana. Select games air nationally on ABC, ESPN, ESPN2, NBA TV, CBS, and CBS Sports Network. Broadcasters for the Fever games are Pat Boylan, Debbie Antonelli, and Tully Bevilaqua.

Chris Denari served as the team's Play-by-Play Announcer from 2000 to 2017 before stepping down.

All games (excluding blackout games, which are available on ESPN3.com) are broadcast to the WNBA League Pass game feeds on the league website. Furthermore, some Fever games are broadcast nationally on ESPN, ESPN2 and ABC. The WNBA has reached an eight-year agreement with ESPN, which will pay right fees to the Fever, as well as other teams in the league.

All-time notes

Regular season attendance
 A sellout for a basketball game at Gainbridge Fieldhouse is:
 18,345 from 2000 to 2006.
 18,165 from 2007 to 2016.
 17,923 from 2017 to 2021.
 A sellout for a basketball game at Indiana Farmers Coliseum, the team's home during part of the 2021 and 2022 seasons, is 6,800.
 A sellout for a basketball game at Hinkle Fieldhouse, the team's home for the end of the 2022 season, is 9,100.

Draft picks
2000 Expansion Draft: Gordana Grubin (1), Sandy Brondello (8), Nyree Roberts (9), Kara Wolters (16), Rita Williams (17), Chantel Tremitiere (24)
2000: Jurgita Streimikyte (26), Usha Gilmore (42), Latina Davis (50), Renee Robinson (58)
2001: Tamika Catchings (3), Kelly Schumacher (14), Niele Ivey (19), Marlene Williams (35), April Brown (51)
2002: Tawana McDonald (13), Zuzi Klimesova (17), Kelly Komara (34), LaKeisha Taylor (49), Jillian Danker (52)
2003 Miami/Portland Dispersal Draft: Sylvia Crawley (7)
2003: Gwen Jackson (6), DeTrina White (20), Ashley McElhiney (35)
2004 Cleveland Dispersal Draft: Deanna Jackson (5)
2004: Ebony Hoffman (9), Ieva Kublina (31)
2005: Tan White (2), Yolanda Paige (16), Ashley Earley (29)
2006: La'Tangela Atkinson (9), Kasha Terry (26), Jessica Foley (38), Marina Kuzina (40)
2007 Charlotte Dispersal Draft: selection waived
2007: Alison Bales (9), Lyndsey Medders (22), Ashley Key (35)
2008: Khadijah Whittington (26)
2009 Houston Dispersal Draft: selection waived
2009: Briann January (6), Christina Wirth (19), Danielle Campbell (32)
2010 Sacramento Dispersal Draft: selection waived
2010: Jene Morris (11), Armelie Lumanu (23), Joy Cheek (35)
2011: Jeanette Pohlen (9), Jori Davis (33)
2012: Sasha Goodlett (11), Courtney Hurt (34)
2014: Natasha Howard (5), Natalie Achonwa (9), Haiden Palmer (29)
2015: Chelsea Gardner (21)
2016: Tiffany Mitchell (9), Brene Moseley (21), Julie Allemand (33)
2017: Erica McCall (17), 
2018: Kelsey Mitchell (2), Victoria Vivians (8), Stephanie Mavunga (14)
2019: Teaira McCowan (3), Paris Kea (25), Caliya Robinson (28)
2020: Lauren Cox (3), Kathleen Doyle (14), Kamiah Smalls (28)
2021: Kysre Gondrezick (4), Unique Thompson (19), Trinity Baptiste (24), Chelsey Perry (26), Florencia Chagas (31), Maya Caldwell (33)
2022: NaLyssa Smith (2), Emily Engstler (4), Lexie Hull (6), Queen Egbo (10), Destanni Henderson (20), Ameshya Williams-Holliday (25), Ali Patberg (34)

Trades
December 15, 1999: The Fever acquired Monica Maxwell from the Washington Mystics in exchange for agreeing to select Nyree Roberts in the expansion draft.
December 15, 1999: The Fever traded Sandy Brondello and a first-round pick in the 2000 Draft to the Miami Sol in exchange for Stephanie White.
April 25, 2000: The Fever traded Latina Davis and Renee Robinson to the Houston Comets in exchange for Latavia Coleman.
April 11, 2001: The Fever traded Kara Wolters to the Sacramento Monarchs in exchange for a first-round pick in the 2001 Draft.
May 27, 2001: The Fever traded a second-round pick in the 2002 Draft to the Detroit Shock in exchange for Olympia Scott and a third-round pick in the 2002 Draft.
December 5, 2001: The Fever traded Angie Braziel to the Washington Mystics in exchange for Nikki McCray and the right to swap second- and fourth-round picks in the 2002 Draft.
March 4, 2002: The Fever traded Gordana Grubin to the Phoenix Mercury in exchange for Bridget Pettis and a first-round pick in the 2002 Draft.
July 20, 2002: The Fever traded Rita Williams to the Houston Comets in exchange for Coquese Washington.
May 1, 2003: The Fever traded Sylvia Crawley and Gwen Jackson to the San Antonio Silver Stars in exchange for Coretta Brown and Natalie Williams.
February 5, 2004: The Fever traded the 3rd overall and the 18th overall picks in the 2004 Draft to the Charlotte Sting in exchange for Kelly Miller and the 9th overall pick in the 2004 Draft.
February 3, 2006: The Fever traded Kelly Miller to the Phoenix Mercury in exchange for Anna DeForge.
February 24, 2006: The Fever traded Kelly Schumacher and the 12th overall pick in the 2006 Draft to the New York Liberty in exchange for the 9th overall pick in the 2006 Draft.
March 7, 2007: The Fever traded Olympia Scott to the Phoenix Mercury in exchange for Ann Strother.
March 23, 2007: The Fever traded La'Tangela Atkinson to the Sacramento Monarchs in exchange for a second-round pick in the 2008 Draft.
February 19, 2008: The Fever traded Tamika Whitmore, the 9th overall pick in the 2008 Draft and the rights to Jessica Foley to the Connecticut Sun in exchange for Katie Douglas.
May 14, 2008: The Fever traded K.B. Sharp to the Chicago Sky in exchange for Bernadette Ngoyisa.
July 4, 2008: The Fever traded Alison Bales to the Atlanta Dream in exchange for Kristen Mann.
May 27, 2010: The Fever traded a second-round pick in the 2011 Draft to the Tulsa Shock in exchange for Shavonte Zellous.
April 29, 2011: The Fever traded second- and third-round picks to the Seattle Storm and the Washington Mystics in exchange for Erin Phillips and Seattle's third-round pick in the 2012 Draft.
March 1, 2012: The Fever traded Tangela Smith to the San Antonio Silver Stars in exchange for Roneeka Hodges.
July 2, 2012: The Fever traded Roneeka Hodges to the Tulsa Shock in exchange for Karima Christmas.
March 11, 2014: The Fever traded Erin Phillips to the Phoenix Mercury in exchange for Lynetta Kizer.
May 12, 2014: The Fever traded a second-round pick in the 2015 Draft to the Phoenix Mercury in exchange for Maggie Lucas.
March 12, 2015: The Fever traded a first- and third-round picks in the 2015 Draft to the San Antonio Stars in exchange for Shenise Johnson and the second-round pick in the 2015 Draft.
February 2, 2016: The Fever traded Natasha Howard to the Minnesota Lynx in exchange for Devereaux Peters.
February 21, 2017: In a three-way trade, the Fever traded Lynetta Kizer and a first-round pick in the 2017 Draft to the Connecticut Sun. The Fever received Candice Dupree and a second-round pick in the 2017 Draft from the Phoenix Mercury.
February 1, 2018: The Fever acquired C Kayla Alexander and 2019 WNBA Draft third round pick via trade from Las Vegas Aces for 2019 WNBA Draft second round pick.
March 6, 2018: The Fever acquired 8th overall pick in the 2018 WNBA Draft via trade from Phoenix Mercury for Briann January.
March 6, 2020: The Fever acquired the 14th pick in the 2020 Draft and Minnesota's second round pick in the 2021 Draft in exchange for Shenise Johnson and the 16th pick in the 2020 Draft.
February 8, 2021: The Fever acquired Lindsay Allen from Las Vegas and the 24th pick in the 2021 Draft in exchange for the 14th pick in the 2021 Draft.
February 15, 2021: The Fever acquired the Minnesota Lynx's 1st and 3rd round picks in the 2022 Draft, Odyssey Sims and negotiating rights to Temi Fagbenle in exchange for the Fever's 2nd round pick in the 2022 Draft.
February 20, 2022: The Fever acquired Bria Hartley, the 7th pick in the 2022 WNBA Draft, Chicago's 2023 First Round Draft pick, and Phoenix's 2022 and 2023 Second Round Draft picks in exchange for Julie Allemand.
March 8, 2022: The Fever acquired the 4th and 6th picks in the 2022 Draft and Dallas' 2023 First Round pick in exchange for Teaira McCowan, the 7th pick in the 2022 Draft and the 2023 First Round pick from Chicago.

All-Stars

2000: None
2001: Rita Williams
2002: Tamika Catchings
2003: Tamika Catchings, Natalie Williams
2004: Natalie Williams
2005: Tamika Catchings
2006: Tamika Catchings, Tamika Whitmore
2007: Tamika Catchings, Anna DeForge, Tammy Sutton-Brown
2008: No All-Star Game
2009: Tamika Catchings, Katie Douglas
2010: Tamika Catchings, Katie Douglas
2011: Tamika Catchings, Katie Douglas
2012: No All-Star Game
2013: Tamika Catchings, Shavonte Zellous
2014: Tamika Catchings, Briann January
2015: Tamika Catchings, Marissa Coleman
2016: No All-Star Game
2017: Candice Dupree
2018: None
2019: Candice Dupree, Erica Wheeler
2020: No All-Star Game
2021: None
2022: None

Olympians
2000: Kara Wolters
2004: Tamika Catchings
2008: Tamika Catchings, Tully Bevilaqua (AUS)
2012: Tamika Catchings
2016: Tamika Catchings, Natalie Achonwa (CAN)
2020: Julie Allemand, (BEL)

Honors and awards

2002 Rookie of the Year: Tamika Catchings
2002 All-WNBA First Team: Tamika Catchings
2003 All-WNBA First Team: Tamika Catchings
2004 All-WNBA Second Team: Tamika Catchings
2004 Most Improved Player: Kelly Miller
2005 All-WNBA Second Team: Tamika Catchings
2005 Defensive Player of the Year: Tamika Catchings
2005 All-Defensive First Team: Tamika Catchings
2005 All-Defensive First Team: Tully Bevilaqua
2005 All-Rookie Team: Tan White
2006 All-Decade Team: Tamika Catchings
2006 All-WNBA First Team: Tamika Catchings
2006 Defensive Player of the Year: Tamika Catchings
2006 All-Defensive First Team: Tamika Catchings
2006 All-Defensive First Team: Tully Bevilaqua
2007 All-WNBA Second Team: Tamika Catchings
2007 Kim Perrot Sportsmanship Award: Tully Bevilaqua
2007 All-Defensive First Team: Tamika Catchings
2007 All-Defensive Second Team: Tully Bevilaqua
2008 Most Improved Player: Ebony Hoffman
2008 All-Defensive First Team: Tamika Catchings
2008 All-Defensive First Team: Tully Bevilaqua
2009 All-WNBA First Team: Tamika Catchings
2009 All-WNBA Second Team: Katie Douglas
2009 Defensive Player of the Year: Tamika Catchings
2009 All-Defensive First Team: Tamika Catchings
2009 All-Defensive First Team: Tully Bevilaqua
2010 All-WNBA First Team: Tamika Catchings
2010 All-WNBA Second Team: Katie Douglas
2010 Defensive Player of the Year: Tamika Catchings
2010 Kim Perrot Sportsmanship Award: Tamika Catchings
2010 All-Defensive First Team: Tamika Catchings
2010 All-Defensive Second Team: Tully Bevilaqua
2010 All-Defensive Second Team: Katie Douglas
2011 Most Valuable Player: Tamika Catchings
2011 All-WNBA First Team: Tamika Catchings
2011 All-Defensive First Team: Tamika Catchings
2011 All-Defensive Second Team: Katie Douglas
2012 Finals Most Valuable Player: Tamika Catchings
2012 Defensive Player of the Year: Tamika Catchings
2012 All-WNBA First Team: Tamika Catchings
2012 All-Defensive First Team: Tamika Catchings
2012 All-Defensive First Team: Briann January
2013 Most Improved Player: Shavonte Zellous
2013 Kim Perrot Sportsmanship Award: Tamika Catchings
2013 All-WNBA Second Team: Tamika Catchings
2013 All-Defensive First Team: Tamika Catchings
2013 All-Defensive Second Team: Briann January
2014 All-Defensive First Team: Briann January
2014 All-Defensive Second Team: Tamika Catchings
2015 All-Rookie Team: Natalie Achonwa
2015 All-Defensive First Team: Tamika Catchings
2015 All-Defensive First Team: Briann January
2015 All-WNBA Second Team: Tamika Catchings
2016 Kim Perrot Sportsmanship Award: Tamika Catchings
2016 All-Defensive First Team: Briann January
2016 All-Defensive Second Team: Tamika Catchings
2016 All-Rookie Team: Tiffany Mitchell
2018 All-Rookie Team: Kelsey Mitchell
2019 All-Star Game MVP: Erica Wheeler
2019 All-Rookie Team: Teaira McCowan
2020 All-Rookie Team: Julie Allemand
2022 All-Rookie Team: Queen Egbo, NaLyssa Smith

References

External links

 
Women's National Basketball Association teams
Basketball teams established in 2000
Sports teams in Indianapolis
Basketball teams in Indiana
2000 establishments in Indiana